Machine is the second EP by the indie rock band Yeah Yeah Yeahs.  It was released in 2002 by Touch and Go Records, and contains three songs from the Fever to Tell sessions. From this EP came one single, "Machine", which was released only in the UK. As of 2009, sales in the United States have exceeded 24,000 copies, according to Nielsen SoundScan.

Track listing

Personnel 
 Karen O – Vocals
 Nick Zinner – Guitars
 Brian Chase – Drums

Production 
 Producers: David Andrew Sitek, Yeah Yeah Yeahs
 Engineer: Paul Mahajan
 Photography: Shannon Sinclair

References 
 

Yeah Yeah Yeahs albums
2002 EPs
Touch and Go Records EPs